It Happened in Paris, is a 1919 American silent drama crime film, directed by David Hartford and Richard Gordon Matzene. There are no known archival holdings of the film, so it is presumably a lost film. The film was a commercial failure.

Cast list
 Madame Yorska as Juliette / Yvonne Dupré
 Lawson Butt as Romildo, the Gypsy
 Rose Dione as Creota
 Charles Gunn as Dick Gray
 Hayward Mack as Leon Naisson
 Sarah Bernhardt as herself
 David Hartford as himself

References

External links 
 
 

1919 drama films
1919 films
Silent American drama films
American silent feature films
American black-and-white films
1910s English-language films
1910s American films